PT Musica Studios is an Indonesian music company based in Jakarta. Known as Metropolitan Studios in the 1960s and then Musica Studios in the 1970s, Musica was founded by Yamin Widjaja, the owner of an electronics store. Musica is one of the largest music companies in Indonesia. Musical artists such as Noah (formerly known as Peterpan), have recorded on the Musica label.

History
Starting from the work of Yamin Widjaja (Amin) as an electronics store owner and record album distributor who opened an outlet in the Pasar Baru area, that's where the long history of the largest recording industry in Indonesia began. The electronics store and record distributor was founded in the early 60's under the name Eka Sapta store. Pak Amin Cengli--as he is usually called Yamin Widjaja--accidentally got acquainted with many famous people in the music world, including songs by Bing Slamet, Ireng Maulana, Eteng Tanamal and Idris Sardi. It was this association around music people that eventually became the inspiration for the birth of the band name Eka Sapta.

As an electronics store owner and record distributor who co-founded Eka Sapta's band, Amin went further by establishing his own record company. At first he borrowed a recording equipment owned by the Remaco company, made recordings in Singapore and built his own recording studio under the name PT Warung Tinggi in the Warung Kopi area of Jakarta. The company initially produced a number of records, including the album Titiek Puspa. This PT Warung Tinggi was the embryo of the establishment of PT Metropolitan Studio on September 9, 1968. Hoki Amin Cengli--the father of 6 children and wife Lanni Djajanegara--is growing. At first it produced the recording band Eka Sapta, songs and sounds recorded by Bing Slamet, A. Riyanto and a number of other recordings in the form of LPs (PH) and cassettes.

Along with the success of the recording debut, in October 1971, Amin changed the name of PT Metropolitan Studio to PT Musica Studio in the form of a formal record company establishment deed. Since then, the recording company's software and hardware have been improving, for example from the number of recording studios which were only 2 with 4 tracks each in 1968 to 8 tracks in 1979, growing again to 16 tracks in 1981 and 24 tracks in 1983. Now there are many recording studios located in the PT Musica Studio complex on Jl. Perdatam Pasar Minggu, South Jakarta, opened 5 pieces.

As the largest recording company in Indonesia, Musica Studio immediately innovates in the work pattern of production management. Improved human resources, increased production quality of recorded albums. When Yamin Widjaja died in August 1979, his wife Mrs. Lanni Djajanegara along with 4 of her 6 children took over the control, becoming the backbone of the recording 'business empire' of PT. Music Studio. The four sons and daughters are Sendjaja Widjaja, Indrawati Widjaja, Tinawati Widjaja and Effendy Widjaja. Under this quartet of hands-on recording workers, PT Musica Studio has developed into a giant music empire in Indonesia, which has succeeded in bringing young musicians to become famous artists in Indonesia. Prior to that, PT Musica Studio was also supported by other Widjaja families, namely Seniwati Widjaja and Sundari Widjaja.

Imprints 
 Musica
 GP Records
 HP Records
 CMM (Cipta Mitra Musik)
 NUR (Nada Utama Records)
 NPS Records
 Maheswara Musik Records (Dangdut specialty label)
 Music Plus
 Siranada

Artist

Bands 
 Noah
 D'Masiv
 Nidji
 Geisha
 ZeroSix Park
 Satria The Monster
 Caessaria

Soloists 
 Iwan Fals
 Maizura
 Shakira Jasmine
 Stevan Pasaribu
 Zara Leola
 Giring Ganesha
 Segara
 Rheno Poetiray
 Adlani Rambe
 Christie
 Difki Khalif
 Rahardian
 Pasha Chrisye

References

External links 
 

Record label distributors
Record labels established in 1968
Indonesian record labels
Indonesian companies established in 1968